Karim Chmielinski (born October 9, 1969), known professionally as Casey Chaos, is an American singer and songwriter. His music has encompassed a number of styles, including hardcore punk, death rock, and metal. He is the frontman of the metal band Amen.

Early life 
Karim Chmielinski was born in New York. When he was seven, his parents separated and Casey, moved with his mother to Melbourne, Florida. By age 10 Casey, was touring professionally as a skater.

Career

1984–1990: Disorderly Conduct 
In 1984, fellow skateboarder Duane Peters played him a tape by the band Black Flag. Chmielinski became enough of a fan that he started corresponding with Henry Rollins and his friend, Ian MacKaye. After seeing Black Flag for the first time live, Casey's life was forever changed. He then decided to start his own band. He created Casey and the Skate Punx, and recruited bassist Scot Lade, drummer Bill Irwin (drums) and his childhood friend from New York, guitarist Ken Decter (aka Duke Decter). They later changed the band name to 'Disorderly Conduct'.

They began writing songs and playing the Florida punk scene. Between his powerful voice and the band's high-energy presence, they became well-known and popular, with people traveling from as far as Atlanta to catch their shows. Between 1984 and 1986, their songs were included in three punk compilation albums. In 1986, they independently released the album Amen. That was followed a year later by the six-track EP Atrocity.

1990–present: Amen 
In 1990, Chaos and Decter moved to Los Angeles, changed their band name to 'Amen'. Chaos met Rikk Agnew, who invited him to sit in as bassist on a concert by his band Christian Death. He then asked Chaos to sing on his new solo album, and play bass on Christian Death's new album, Iconologia, for which Chaos also wrote or co-wrote three songs.

Chaos then wrote and recorded the album Slave, for which he played all of the instruments. He released it under the Amen name in 1994 and began to put together a new lineup: Paul Fig and Sonny Mayo on guitar, John Fahnestock (aka John Tumor) on bass and Shannon Larkin on drums.

The band was eventually signed to Roadrunner Records which, in 1999, released a split EP with Misfits, the five-track EP Coma America and their debut album, Amen. To support the album, Amen went on a tour of North America with Slipknot, Machine Head and Coal Chamber, among others. Amen parted ways with Roadrunner records and they were quickly picked up by This Is An I Am Recording!, the Virgin Records sub-label of producer Ross Robinson and went into the studio to record the album 'We Have Come For Your Parents'. In 2001, this album was released and was met with critical acclaim. After the release of 'We Have Come For Your Parents' Roadrunner re-released Amen due to the popularity of the band and press that they were getting.

In March 2002, Chaos announced that Amen had been dropped from Virgin after internal restructuring of their recording division. Amen had just recorded 20+ tracks for their new album and Virgin refused to release them. Amen went onto tour whilst they searched for a label to release new material under.

In 2004, Daron Malakian of System of a Down had founded his own label, through Columbia Records, called EatUrMusic Records. Malakian and Chaos had met at the 2002 Big Day Out festival in Australia and had become friends. Chaos put together a new lineup, recruiting bassist Scott Sorry, drummer Luke Johnson, and guitarists Matt Montgomery (aka Piggy D.) and Rich Jones. Amen was the first band Malakian signed and the label released Amen's Death Before Musick in 2004, along with a video for the single "California's Bleeding". The band then embarked on a world tour in promotion of this release.

In 2005 Chaos released a compilation box set. This included previously unreleased Amen and Disorderly Conduct track in addition to remixes of previously released songs.

In 2007, Amen were invited to perform on The Henry Rollins Show, a weekly talk show hosted by musician Henry Rollins on IFC. Amen performed three songs, two of which aired live: "Coma America" and "Liberation", with the third "Another Planet" release in IFC.com. The performance aired internationally on July 13, 2007, on the 14th episode of Season 2. Between the two songs, Chaos made political death threats and it became the first of the show's episodes to have material cut by IFC, although it ran the full performance on its website. Amen then went on a full tour of Europe including a co-headline slot with Kreator, at the Damnation Festival hosted at the University of Leeds. Amen booked a full European tour.

In 2014, Chaos went back into the studio with Amen to begin recording a new album with Ross Robinson with Dave Lombardo on drums. Due to former commitments the album recording was not completed with Ross Robinson and Amen went on to perform at Knotfest in support of Slipknot. In late 2019 Chaos went back into the studio to continue work on the latest Amen album in the UK before Corona Virus put a hold on the recording.

Since 2002 
Chaos collaborated with Twiggy Ramirez and members of Queens of the Stone Age on a project called Headband, who recorded music but never released it. Chaos was also a founding member of the band Scars on Broadway.

Chaos produced an EP for The Kinison, working with the band off the back of a demo they passed Chaos when he was touring with Amen.

Chaos then founded the band Scum, with black metal icons Samoth and Cosmocrator from Zyklon, Bård Faust from Emperor, and Happy Tom from Turbonegro. Scum eventually released an album, 2005's Gospels for the Sick, which was nominated in the metal category at Norway's 2006 Alarm Awards.

In 2005, Chaos recorded a song for No End In Sight, an album by the band This Is Menace. Amen was then meant to tour with the band, but all dates were canceled when Chaos had to undergo emergency surgery to repair 'multiple ruptured hernias'. When he got out of hospital, Amen joined the band Sick of It All to fulfill its European tour commitment.

In 2006, Casey Chaos received a Grammy Award certificate in recognition of his participation "as a songwriter on the Grammy Award-winning recording "B.Y.O.B."

Chaos was part of the supergroup Ross Robinson assembled to write the soundtrack for the House of Shock documentary. The documentary is yet to be released.

Discography 
Albums

With Disorderly Conduct:
Amen (1986), Dirge Records

With Amen:
Slave (1994), Drag-u-la Records
Amen (1999), Roadrunner Records
We Have Come For Your Parents (2000), Virgin Records
Death Before Musick (2004), EatURMusic/Columbia
Gun Of A Preacherman (2005), Snapper Music/Secret Records

Solo:
Pisstory: A Catalogue Of Accidents, A Lifetime Of Mistakes (2005), Refuse Music

With Scum:
Gospels For The Sick (2006) (Dogjob/Candlelight Records)

EPs (with Amen)
Uncontrolled Music For A Controlled Society (1999), Roadrunner Records
Coma America (1999) Roadrunner Records
Frontline Volume 3 – The Singles Club (1999, split with Misfits), Roadrunner Records
Propamenda (2000), Virgin Records
The Price of Reality (2000), Virgin Records/This Is An I Am Recording!
Too Hard To Be Free (2000), Virgin Records
The Waiting 18 (2001), Virgin Records/This Is An I Am Recording!
California's Bleeding (2004), EatURMusic/Columbia

Singles (with Amen)
"Coma America" (1999), Roadrunner Records
"The Price Of Reality" (2000), Virgin Records
"Too Hard To Be Free" (2000), Virgin Records
"The Waiting 18" (2001), Virgin Records
"California's Bleeding" (2004),  EatURMusic/Columbia

Soundtrack credits
Faust: Love of the Damned (2000, film)
Final Destination (2000, film)
Atop the Fourth Wall (2012, TV series)
House of Shock (2013, documentary)One Hit Wonderland (2015, TV series)Roll Red Roll (2018, Documentary)

Compilation inclusions
Disorderly Conduct – I'm Buck Naked! (1984), BCT
Disorderly Conduct – Flipside Vinyl Fanzine 2 (1985), Gasatanka Records
Disorderly Conduct – There's A Method To Our Madness (1986), Phantom Records
Amen – Launch (2000, video compilation), Launch Magazine
Casey Chaos – Rise Above: 24 Black Flag Songs to Benefit the West Memphis Three (2002), Sanctuary Records
Amen – Join Or Die (2003), Refuse Music
Amen – Here's the Poison (2016), Secret Records

Guest appearances
Rikk Agnew – Turtle (1992), Triple X Records
Christian Death – Iconologic (1992), Triple X Records
Christian Death – Sleepless Nights Live 1990 (1993), Cleopatra Records
Queens Of The Stone Age – Songs For The Deaf (2002, as guest DJ), Interscope Records
This Is Menace – No End In Sight (2005), PSI Records
Christian Death – Death Club (2005, compilation), Cleopatra Records
Ministry / Paul Barker – Fix (2012), Gigantic Pictures

DVDs
Amen – Caught In The Act (2004, live) Secret Records
Christian Death Featuring: Rozz Williams – Live (2005), Cleopatra Records
Ministry / Paul Barker – Fix'' (2012), Gigantic Pictures

References

External links 

 Casey Chaos official website(defunct)
 Official YouTube

1969 births
Living people
American singer-songwriters
Daron Malakian and Scars on Broadway members
Christian Death members
Amen (American band) members
Grip Inc. members
Nu metal singers